The 2022 Betfred World Matchplay was the 29th annual staging of the World Matchplay, organised by the Professional Darts Corporation. The tournament took place at the Winter Gardens, Blackpool, from 16–24 July 2022.

Peter Wright was the defending champion after defeating Dimitri Van den Bergh 18–9 in the 2021 final. However, he was defeated by Van den Bergh 16–14 in the quarter-finals, in a rematch of the previous year's final.

Michael van Gerwen won his third World Matchplay title, defeating Gerwyn Price 18–14 in the final.

Gerwyn Price hit the first nine-dart finish in the tournament for four years in his semi-final win over Danny Noppert.

This tournament also had a separate women's event which took place on the day of the final of the main tournament and was won by Fallon Sherrock.

Format
All matches have to be won by two clear legs, with a match being extended if necessary for a maximum of six extra legs before a tie-break leg is required. For example, in a first to 10 legs first round match, if the score reaches 12–12 then the 25th leg will be the decider.

The matches get longer as the tournament progresses:

Prize money
The prize fund was increased by £100,000 and rose to £800,000.

Qualification
The top 16 players on the PDC Order of Merit at the cut-off point on 11 July were seeded for the tournament. The top 16 players on the ProTour Order of Merit, not to have already qualified on the cut-off date, were unseeded.

The following players qualified for the tournament:

PDC Order of Merit
  (quarter-finals)
  (runner-up)
  (second round)
  (champion)
  (second round)
  (first round)
  (quarter-finals)
  (first round)
  (semi-finals)
  (second round)
  (semi-finals)
  (first round)
  (second round)
  (quarter-finals)
  (second round)
  (second round)

PDC ProTour qualifiers
  (first round)
  (quarter-finals)
  (first round)
  (first round)
  (first round)
  (second round)
  (first round)
  (first round)
  (first round)
  (first round)
  (first round)
  (first round)
  (first round)
  (first round)
  (first round)
  (second round)

Schedule

Draw

Top averages
The table lists all players who achieved an average of at least 100 in a match. In the case one player has multiple records, this is indicated by the number in brackets.

References

World Matchplay (darts)
World Matchplay
World Matchplay
World Matchplay